A number of steamships have been named Daphne, including:

, which sank at launch with high loss of life
, torpedoed and sunk by U-69 in 1941

Ship names